Court Room - Sachchai Hazir Ho ( Court Room - Is the truth present?) is an Indian Hindi-language television series based on law and crime produced by Optimystix Entertainment. It premiered on 9 February 2019 on Colors TV and is hosted by Vikas Kumar.

Plot 
The series revolves around crimes and its jurisdiction. The series is inspired from the real cases put forward to the court. It deals the problems in name changing, cold murder and gives a logical moral to the case.

Cast
Vikas Kumar as Host
Sanjeev Tyagi as Lawyer
Nissar Khan as Lawyer
Rushad Rana
Bhuvnesh Shetty

Episodes

Rating
The show earned poor ratings due to its timeslot and the makers will wrap up Court Room by May 5, 2019.

References 

Colors TV original programming
2019 Indian television series debuts
Courtroom drama television series
Television series by Optimystix Entertainment